Moorella mulderi  is a Gram-positive, thermophilic, homoacetogenic, anaerobic and spore-forming bacterium from the genus Moorella, which has been isolated from a sulfate reducing bioreactor in Wageningen in the Netherlands.

References

 

Thermoanaerobacterales
Bacteria described in 2005
Thermophiles
Anaerobes
Acetogens